Douglas Baptista (born 1962), known as The São Vicente Maniac (Portuguese: Maníaco de São Vicente), is a Brazilian serial killer who drowned at least eight children in the Baixada Santista metropolitan area from 1992 to 2003. Arrested and convicted for several of the crimes, he is currently serving a lengthy sentence.

Crimes 

As victims, Baptista would choose poor children aged between five and twelve years of age. He would usually befriend the children's family members and often offered them gifts, but sometimes he would simply offer to take them on a walk or fishing trip.

When they arrived at a suitable location, Baptista would tie the victims up, likely rape them (thus far, rape could be proven only in one case, as semen was found in the victim's vagina) and throw them into a body of water - a river, mangrove or sea - and drown them. Other victims may also have been strangled.

Christmas murders 
On Christmas Day in 2003, two girls disappeared from their homes in São Vicente. The victims were Nathaly Jenifer Ribeiro and Najila de Jesus, both five years old. Their bodies were found four days later floating in the Mambu River near Itanhaém, with both hands and feet tied. Authorities rigorously searched for the criminal at the time, but were unable to link any potential suspect.

Investigation and arrest 
Baptista was initially arrested for the murders in 2004, but despite confessing to them, he was not convicted and was released. Some time later, Baptista moved to Porto Alegre, where he lived for the next few years. In 2013, he was arrested for the murder of Fabiana dos Santos and sentenced to serve 18 years at the São Vicente Penitentiary for her murder, but was later paroled.

Eventually, authorities managed to connect Baptista to the Christmas murders and arrested him at his home in Praia Grande on December 8, 2015. He reportedly attempted to flee after seeing the police cars, but was cut off and apprehended. After he was taken into custody, Baptista initially claimed that he did not know he was sought by police and claimed that he was innocent, but eventually confessed and revealed that he had killed six other children, including his stepdaughter, and later showed where he had disposed of the bodies. When pressed for a motive, Baptista claimed that he "felt pleasure in seeing the victims struggling when they were drowning" and was possessed by a strange force.

Trial and investigation 
Before his trial would start, Baptista was examined by psychiatrist Guido Palomba, who concluded that he was abnormal and "absolutely unrecoverable." After this, he was put on trial for the murders of Ribeiro and De Jesus, was swiftly convicted, and subsequently sentenced to 30 years imprisonment. Two years later, in August 2017, he was given an additional 30-year sentence for the murder of Priscila Elias Inácio.

Imprisonment 
Currently, Baptista is kept in isolation from other inmates due to the severity of his crimes and due to fears that he would be killed by fellow inmates.

Proposal of bill 
After the discovery of Baptista's crimes, a bill was created to typify serial murder. The proposal established that at least three crimes with the same modus operandi as a serial crime and proposed a full 30-year sentence without the chance of parole. The proposal was eventually shelved.

Known victims 
 Luana Elias Inácio, 9, killed on March 21, 1996; body found in a river in Praia Grande
 Priscila Elias Inácio (Luana's sister), 8, killed on October 29, 1997; body found in an inlet in São Vicente
 Vanessa (Baptista's stepdaughter), 12
 Fabiana Silva dos Santos, 9, body never found
 Sabrina, 10, and Leandro, 9, cousins who were kidnapped while en route to school
 Nathaly Ribeiro and Najila de Jesus, both 5, killed in December 2003; bodies located on December 29 in Mambu River; Ribeiro had been raped

See also 
 List of serial killers by country

In media and culture 
Baptista's crimes were covered on the crime show Investigação Criminal.

References 

1962 births
20th-century Brazilian criminals
21st-century Brazilian criminals
Brazilian murderers of children
Brazilian people convicted of murder
Brazilian rapists
Brazilian serial killers
Living people
Male serial killers
People convicted of murder by Brazil
People from São Paulo
Violence against children